Joseph Delattre (20 August 1858, Déville-lès-Rouen – 6 August 1912) was a French painter of the Rouen School. He exhibited at the Fifth Impressionist Exhibition of 1880.

Life and career 
Delattre was a faithful friend Charles Angrand and Claude Monet, the fierce advocates of new ideas and Impressionism. His first paintings form part of the Barbizon school tradition, progressively evolving with greater freedom, simplified shapes, and faded contours lines. As the conventional character of his paintings became further removed, the general public's misunderstanding of his work grew.

In 1895 Delattre founded the Académie libre (Free Academy) on rue des Charrettes in Rouen. The workshop, including excursions outdoors to work En plein air at Pré-aux-Loups or Côte Sainte-Catherine, became a rallying point for young independent artists of the new generation of l'École de Rouen. His students included Pierre Dumont and Robert Antoine Pinchon.

Joseph Delattre formed close ties with Léon Jules Lemaître and Charles Frechon. The three towards the end of the 1880s, influenced by the Pointism of Camille Pissarro, were referred to as the les trois mousquetaires.

Chemin Joseph-Delattre in Barentin is named after him, as are the Rue Joseph-Delattre in Canteleu, Maromme  Le Mesnil-Esnard, Pavilly and Rouen.

Admired by a generation of artists from Rouen, he wrote modestly: "Je n'aurai donné qu'un petit son de flûte mais il aura été juste".

Bibliography 

 Le Prix Bouctot (beaux-arts) de 1910 : les peintres Henri Cauchois & Joseph Delattre, Cagniard, Rouen, 1910
 Bernard Du Chatenet, Joseph Delattre, 1858-1912, BDS, Rouen, 1974, 151 p.
 François Lespinasse, L'École de Rouen, Fernandez, Sotteville-lès-Rouen, 1980
 François Lespinasse, Joseph Delattre 1858-1912, 1985
 François Lespinasse, L'École de Rouen, Lecerf, Rouen, 1995, 
 L'École de Rouen de l'impressionnisme à Marcel Duchamp 1878-1914, Musée des Beaux-Arts de Rouen, 1996,

Gallery

References

External links 
 Musée des Beaux-Arts de Rouen, Musée d'Orsay, Paris, Base Joconde
 Wally Findlay Galleries International

1858 births
1912 deaths
19th-century French painters
French male painters
20th-century French painters
20th-century French male artists
People from Déville-lès-Rouen
19th-century French male artists